Sinocyclocheilus macrophthalmus is a species of ray-finned fish in the genus Sinocyclocheilus.

References 

macrophthalmus
Fish described in 2001